Adesmus hemispilus is a species of beetle in the family Cerambycidae. It was described by Ernst Friedrich Germar in 1821. It is known from Paraguay, Argentina, and Brazil.

References

Adesmus
Beetles described in 1821